Gate City Bank is a mutually owned bank headquartered in Fargo, North Dakota, with 43 branches across North Dakota and central Minnesota. The Bank is governed by a six-member Board of Directors elected by the membership.

History
Founded in 1923 by eight members as Gate City Building & Loan Association. In 2021, its total assets reached $3.1 billion.

External links
 Official web site

References

Banks based in North Dakota
Companies based in Fargo–Moorhead
Banks established in 1923
1923 establishments in North Dakota
American companies established in 1923